Tony Jurgens (born November 28, 1964) is an American politician and member of the Minnesota House of Representatives. A member of the Republican Party of Minnesota, he represents District 54B in the southeastern Twin Cities metropolitan area.

Early life, education, and career
Jurgens was born on November 28, 1964. Jurgens attended Southwest Minnesota State University, graduating with a Bachelor of Science in business administration in 1988.

Jurgens served on the Cottage Grove Economic Development Authority, the Cottage Grove Public Services Commission, and the Washington County Library Board. He is an insurance broker.

Minnesota House of Representatives
Jurgens was first elected to the Minnesota House of Representatives in 2016.

Personal life
Jurgens and his wife, Dawn, reside in Cottage Grove, Minnesota. They have two daughters. Jurgens is a member of St. Elizabeth Ann Seton Catholic Church in Hastings, Minnesota and a member of the Knights of Columbus.

References

External links

 Official House of Representatives website
 Official campaign website

1964 births
Living people
Republican Party members of the Minnesota House of Representatives
21st-century American politicians